The Elsie Refuge for women and children was a women's refuge set up in Glebe, Sydney in 1974. The project was the beginning of the NSW Women's Refuge Movement that responded to the needs of women and children escaping domestic violence by providing access to specialist accommodation and support services operating within a feminist framework.

History

A group of Women's Liberation activists, led by Anne Summers including Bessie Guthrie and Jennifer Dakers, squatted an abandoned property in Westmoreland Street, Glebe and set up the refuge in response to the lack of services & support available to women & children suffering from domestic violence.  Initially, there was no support from governments, with the staff at the centre providing security with nothing more than a cricket bat.  They were one of a number of activist groups who had squatted in derelict houses in the Anglican Church owned "Glebe Estate" in the pathway of a proposed freeway part of which was to pass through the area. The building, along with the other 700 dwellings on Glebe Estate, was purchased from the Anglican Church by the Whitlam Government in 1974 and the refuge was granted a lease. The Whitlam Government established the Department of Urban and Regional Development, who fought back against the proposed expressway and redevelopment projects, and provided funding for the refuge. Later the refuge was moved to larger premises in nearby Derwent Street.

Although crisis accommodation for women had been available for a long time, it was very limited. Elsie Refuge and its feminist counterparts were the first to run a service from a feminist perspective that focused on helping women escape domestic violence.

The management of Elsie Women's Refuge was handed over to the St Vincent de Paul Society in August 2014. The records of the Elsie Women's Refuge for the years 1974-2014 are held in the collection of the State Library of New South Wales.

See also 

 NSW Women's Refuge Movement

References

Further reading
 The NSW Women’s Refuge Movement’s Little Book of Refuges- First Edition

External links
 Elsie Women's Refuge, managed by St Vincent de Paul Society.
 Newspaper articles covering events related to Elsie Refuge
 Forty years of the Elsie Refuge for Women and Children, Dictionary of Sydney website

Feminist organisations in Australia
Women's organisations based in Australia
Glebe, New South Wales
Women's shelters in Australia
1974 establishments in Australia
2014 disestablishments in Australia